The Journey YYC, Vol. 1 is the second extended play by Canadian country artist Paul Brandt, released on April 6, 2018. The EP is the first part of a two-part series with the second volume The Journey BNA, Vol. 2 being released in November 2018. Brandt debuted the extended play live at a CBC Music "First Play Live" event in Toronto, Ontario in April 2018.

Background
Brandt conceived the idea of the two-part extended play series while on a motorcycle trip along the Pacific Coast Highway in California. He thought of it as a reverse concept of his past hit "Alberta Bound", starting with him conceptually in Calgary, Alberta (YYC), before progressing to Nashville, Tennessee (BNA) for the second volume.

Track listing

Personnel
Adapted from AllMusic.

Liz Brandt - background vocals
Paul Brandt - lead vocals, production, songwriting, composing
Jimmy Carter - bass guitar
Court Clement - electric guitar
J.T. Corenflos - electric guitar
Elenore Denig - strings
Richard Dodd - mastering
Dan Dugmore - guitar
Ben Fowler - mixing, production
Cara Fox - strings
Vicki Hampton - background vocals
Mark Hill - bass guitar
Charles Judge - keyboard, synthesizer
Trey Keller - background vocals
Joel Key - guitar, acoustic guitar
Todd Lombardo - banjo, dobro, guitar, acoustic guitar, mandolin
Gordon Mote - keyboard, Hammond B-3 organ, piano
Nichole Nordeman - songwriting, composing
Mike "X" O'Connor - electric guitar, keyboard, mixing, production, programming
Mike Payne - acoustic guitar, electric guitar
Doug Romanow - composing, keyboards, songwriting, programming
Ben Stennis - composing, songwriting
Christopher Stevens - composing, songwriting
Russell Terrell - background vocals
Brianna Tyson - background vocals
Scott Williamson - drums
Nir Z - drums

Charts

Album

Singles

References
 

2018 EPs
Paul Brandt EPs